Ken Drake may refer to:

 Ken Drake (photographer) (born 1970), Australian photographer
 Ken Drake (actor) (1921–1987), American actor